Anton Eberst (27 April 1920 – 19 February 2005), a former student of Bruno Brun, was a Serbian clarinetist, clarinet teacher and founder of the Wind Department at the Isidor Bajić School of Music in Novi Sad and author of numerous textbooks and articles about the wind instruments.

References

External links
Official website of the Isidor Bajić School of Music in Novi Sad

1920 births
2005 deaths
Banat Swabians
Serbian classical clarinetists
People from Vršac
20th-century classical musicians
Yugoslav musicians